Antony Passage is a hamlet in south-east Cornwall, England, UK. It stands beside the tidal section of the River Lynher (a tributary of the River Tamar) on the opposite bank to Antony village.

References

External links

Hamlets in Cornwall